Harry Edwin Von Kersburg (October 14, 1884 – 1951) was an American football player and coach. He served as the head football coach at the College of the Holy Cross in Worcester, Massachusetts in 1913, compiling a record of 3–6. Kersburg was a football player and later an assistant coach at Harvard University.

Head coaching record

References

1884 births
Year of death missing
American football guards
Harvard Crimson football coaches
Harvard Crimson football players
Holy Cross Crusaders football coaches